Earthworm Tractors is a 1936 American film directed by Ray Enright and starring Joe E. Brown and June Travis. The film is also known as A Natural Born Salesman in the United Kingdom.

The film is based on characters created by William Hazlett Upson in a series of stories that appeared in The Saturday Evening Post. The series featured Alexander Botts, an eternally optimistic self-proclaimed "natural-born salesman", and the Earthworm Tractor Company, and was inspired in part by Upson's actual work experience with the Caterpillar Tractor Company.

Plot summary
In this slapstick romantic comedy, the bumbling, but perpetually optimistic "natural-born salesman" Alexander Botts is egged on by his sweetheart Sally to do great things, so he writes a letter to the Earthworm Tractor Company, and is hired as a salesman despite the fact that he knows nothing about tractors. He gets fired more than once for all the destruction he causes, but is rehired by getting orders. After Sally abandons him as a failure and marries another man, he falls in love with Mabel, daughter of the cranky and partially deaf Sam, the owner of a lumberyard who believes he does not need tractors to clear paths for his lumbermen. Botts continues to enrage Sam via various antics such as moving Sam's house with Sam in it without telling him in advance and in the process destroying most of Sam's furniture. Eventually, he proves a super salesman by selling many tractors to Sam after he cures him of his deafness, and wins Mabel's love.

Cast
Joe E. Brown as Alexander Botts
June Travis as Mabel Johnson
Guy Kibbee as Sam Johnson
Dick Foran as Emmet McManus
Carol Hughes as Sally Blair
Gene Lockhart as George Healey
Olin Howland as Mr. Blair
Joseph Crehan as Mr. Henderson
Charles C. Wilson as H.J. Russell
William B. Davidson as Mr. Jackson
Irving Bacon as Taxicab Driver
Stuart Holmes as The Doctor
Frederick Schmitt as tractor driving stunt double for Joe E. Brown

Copyright status
The failure of the original copyright holder to renew the film's copyright resulted in it falling into public domain, meaning that virtually anyone could duplicate and sell copies of the film. Many of the versions of this film available are badly edited and of extremely poor quality, having been duped from second- or third-generation copies.

Soundtrack

References

External links

 
 

1936 comedy films
1936 films
American black-and-white films
1930s English-language films
Warner Bros. films
American comedy films
Films produced by Samuel Bischoff
Films directed by Ray Enright
1930s American films